Jakarta State Polytechnic (in Indonesian: Politeknik Negeri Jakarta), abbreviated as PNJ. It is located in the north part of Depok, West Java.

Academics
Jakarta State Polytechnic has departments and study programs as follows:

Diploma III
Mechanical Engineering
Civil Engineering
Electronic Engineering
Accounting
Business Administration
Graphic Arts and Publishing Techniques

Diploma IV
Mechanical Engineering
Civil Engineering
Business Administration
Information Technology

Facilities
Library
Laboratory
Language Laboratory
Sports and Leisure
Workshop
Heavy Equipment Workshop
Cafeteria
Mosque

References

External links
 Official website

Buildings and structures in Depok
Colleges in Indonesia